Savage Steve Holland (born April 29, 1958) is an American writer, cartoonist, producer, voice actor, animator, and film director who wrote and directed the films Better Off Dead (1985) and One Crazy Summer (1986), starring John Cusack. He also directed the film How I Got into College (1989), and animated the "Whammy" on the game show Press Your Luck. He later went on to create and produce Eek! the Cat and The Terrible Thunderlizards for Fox Kids. He now manages his own studio, Savage Studios Ltd., and directs shows for Disney Channel and Nickelodeon.

He studied animation at the California Institute of the Arts, where one of his student projects Going Nowhere Fast (1980), was exhibited at the Museum of Modern Art show Tomorrowland: CalArts in Moving Pictures.

Selected filmography
Better Off Dead (1985)
One Crazy Summer (1986)
How I Got into College (1989)
The Last Halloween (1991)
The Incredible Crash Dummies (1993) (writer only)
Safety Patrol (1998) (TV film)
Stuck in the Suburbs (2004) (TV film)
Shredderman Rules (2007) (TV film)
Legally Blondes (2009)
Ratko: The Dictator's Son (2009)
A Fairly Odd Movie: Grow Up, Timmy Turner! (2011) (TV film)
Big Time Movie (2011)
A Fairly Odd Christmas (2012) (TV film)
A Fairly Odd Summer (2014) (TV film)
Santa Hunters (2014)
Rufus (2016)
Rufus 2 (2017)
Malibu Rescue: The Movie (2019) (TV film)
Malibu Rescue: The Next Wave (2020) (TV film)

Selected television series credits
Press Your Luck (1983–1986) (designer and animator of the "Whammy", all episodes)
Saturday Night Live (1988–1990) (assistant director for two seasons)
The New Adventures of Beans Baxter (1987–1988) (wrote and directed most episodes)
Encyclopedia Brown (1989–1990) (director)
Bill & Ted's Excellent Adventures (1990–1991) (writer)
Eek! the Cat (1992–1998) (co-creator, executive producer, and wrote most of the episodes)
The Puzzle Place (1994–1998) (director)
V.I.P. (1998–2002) (directed many episodes)
Honey, I Shrunk the Kids: The TV Show (1997–1998) (directed 3 episodes)
Kenan & Kel (1997–1999) (wrote 6 episodes)
Sabrina: The Animated Series (1999) (creator, developer, casting director, voice director and executive producer)
Even Stevens (2000-2002) (directed 3 episodes)
Lizzie McGuire (2001–2003) (directed 9 episodes)
Phil of the Future (2004) (directed 4 episodes)
Unfabulous (2005–2007) (directed 7 episodes)
Zoey 101 (2005–2007) (directed 5 episodes)
Ned's Declassified School Survival Guide (2005–2007) (directed 11 episodes, 1 of them the one-hour series finale)
Zeke and Luther (2009–2011) (directed 11 episodes)
Big Time Rush (2009–2013) (directed 20 episodes, 5 of them being 2-part specials)
Kirby Buckets (2014-2017) (directed 6 episodes)
School of Rock (2016) (directed 1 episode)
Bizaardvark (2016) (directed 3 episodes)
Malibu Rescue (2019) (creator)

References

External links

1958 births
20th-century American screenwriters
21st-century American screenwriters
American animators
American animated film directors
American animated film producers
American film directors
American television directors
American television producers
American television writers
American male television writers
American male voice actors
American casting directors
American voice directors
California Institute of the Arts alumni
Living people
Place of birth missing (living people)
American cartoonists
20th-century American male writers
21st-century American male writers